Palm Valley, or Tadban, is a region in Hyderabad, Telangana, India. It is part of the Bahadurpura constituency. The names Tadban and Palm Valley come from the multitude of palm trees (taḍ) that grew in the area in the late 19th century. It is close to Mir Alam Tank.

Area

The Valley is divided into three regions: Central Road, K.J. Hills, and X-Roads. The area under central denotes from the police station to the end of the vegetable market; the inside sub-region is marked as K.J. Hills; while the area on the outskirts of Palm Valley is considered as X-Roads.

Education
Between the 1990s and the 2010s, the local literacy level increased to a great extent. Local schools include:
 MANIS HIGH SCHOOL INDRA NAGAR TADBAN
 Boston Mission High School
 Al-Suffa Mission High School 
 Government Boys' School (Galbalguda & KaliKamaan)
 Kilpatrik Mission High School
 St. Marys High School
 St. Alphonsa High School

Landmarks
National Highway 44 passes near Nehru Zoological Park. The same highway connects to Rajiv Gandhi International Airport in Hyderabad.

Other landmarks include:

 Aashoor Khana
 Nayeem Complex Tadban x Road
 Eidgah Mir Alam
 Electricity Junction
 K.J Hills
 Miralam Water Reservoir
 Miralam Lake
 Police Station
 Shah Function Palace
 Vegetable Market
 Jamia Masjid Siddiq-e-Akbar. (Behind kalapathar P.S)

Geography of Hyderabad, India